Dritmir Beci (born 9 June 1996) is an Albanian professional footballer who plays for KF Burreli in the Kategoria e Parë as a defender.

Club career
He was promoted to the Vllaznia Shkodër first team ahead of the 2015–16 campaign, before joining Tërbuni Pukë on loan in January 2016.

References

1996 births
Living people
Footballers from Shkodër
Albanian footballers
Association football defenders
Kategoria Superiore players
Kategoria e Parë players
KF Vllaznia Shkodër players
KF Tërbuni Pukë players
FK Tomori Berat players
KS Burreli players